PowerNation is an American automotive how-to enthusiast television program that began originally as PowerBlock. The programming is produced by Gray Television, which purchased the assets of PowerNation's former owner Raycom Media in 2019. PowerNation consists of a block of automotive enthusiast shows including Engine Power, XOR (Xtreme Off Road), Truck Tech, and Detroit Muscle. PowerNation airs on the History Channel, and also features content on its own through a digital media player app available on the Amazon Fire TV, Apple TV and Roku platforms.

History
PowerNation first began airing on The Nashville Network (commonly referred to as TNN, now the Paramount Network, which shifted to a general entertainment model in 2018 and stopped carrying PowerNation programming) in 1999 as PowerBlock. PowerBlock rebranded to PowerNation in 2014 and began airing on NBCSN and CBS Sports Network in addition to the Paramount Network. PowerBlock was originally hosted by Actress and Entertainer Michelle Spaziano. PowerNation was originally hosted by Courtney Hansen. The current host of PowerNation is Katie Osborne. PowerNation is produced by RTM Studios in Franklin, TN.

Programming

XOR 
XOR (previously known as Xtreme 4x4 and Xtreme Off Road) began airing in 2005 on Spike TV (now Paramount Network). Xtreme 4x4 was originally hosted by Jessi Combs and Ian Johnson. Following the departure of Jessi Combs in 2008, Ian Johnson hosted Xtreme Off Road for many years before departing in 2017. XOR is currently hosted by Jeremy Weckman and Eliza Leon. XOR is a how-to show format where regular vehicles get turned into off road rigs.

Engine Power 
Engine Power (previously known as HorsePower) began airing in 1999 on The Nashville Network (now Paramount Network). Engine Power is currently hosted by Pat Topolinski and Frankie Forman. Engine Power follows a how-to show format that focuses on assembling and tuning everything from mild performance street engines to full-race monster engines.

Truck Tech 
Truck Tech (previously known as Trucks!) began airing in 1999 on The Nashville Network (now Paramount Network). Trucks! was originally hosted by Stacey David.  After leaving in 2005, Trucks! was hosted by Kevin Tetz, Ryan Shand, and others since then. Truck Tech is currently hosted by Lawrence "LT" Tolman and Austin LeFort. Truck Tech follows a how-to show format that shows viewers how to restore, modify, customize and paint classic and late model trucks.

Detroit Muscle 
Detroit Muscle (previously known as Muscle Car) began airing in 2006 on Spike TV (now Paramount Network). Muscle Car was hosted by Lou Santiago, Tommy Boshers, Joe Elmore, Marc Christ, Daniel Boshears and others throughout the years. Detroit Muscle is currently hosted by Tommy Boshers and Joel McMillan. Detroit Muscle follows a how-to show format restoring and modifying classic and late model muscle cars.

Other Programming 
Over the years, RTM Studios has produced a variety of enthusiast programs for television and digital outlets including:

 PowerNation Daily (2015 - Current)
 PowerNation Garage (2016 - Current)
 PowerNation On The Road (2016 - Current)
 American Shooter
 The Gold Prospector
 Motor Trend
 Hot Rod
 Car and Driver Television
 RV Today
 Everything Outdoors
 Top Dead Center
 Search and Restore

PowerNation Daily 
PowerNation Daily is a digital automotive news show featuring car and truck news and viral videos. PowerNation Daily is hosted by Gannon Pritchard.

PowerNation Garage 
PowerNation Garage is a digital how to show hosted by the various hosts of PowerNation.

American Shooter 
American Shooter was an American half-hour sports program which ran from 1993 to 2003, first on ESPN, and then on TNN (now Paramount Network), and finally, on OLN (now NBCSN). Hosted by Jim Scoutten. The show featured competitions, classic firearms, gun tech, and exhibition shooting. Each episode featured a segment called "Great Guns", featuring a look back at the classic firearms that shaped American history. The segments were originally narrated by Marc Stengel during the first two seasons. Beginning in Season 3 (1995), Scoutten narrated the segments, rather than Stengel. Another segment featured on American Shooter was Gun Tech, featuring the latest in guns, and shooting gears. This segment debuted in Season 5 (1997), and ran until the end of the series. The final segment of each episode called "Shot of the Week" featuring exhibition shooters demonstrating some shooting tips and techniques. The segments were originally hosted by Michael Blackburn and Byron Ferguson during the first two seasons. Beginning in Season 3 (1995), Bob Munden and John Satterwhite hosted the segments. But Satterwhite departed in Season 4 (1996), leaving Byron Ferguson, and Bob Munden. Byron Ferguson left the show at the end of Season 7 (1999), and was replaced by exhibition shooter Tom Knapp, who joined the show in Season 8 (2000), and stayed until the end of the series. American Shooter was produced by RTM Productions (now RTM Studios).

For the first four seasons, American Shooter was broadcast on ESPN, as part of their ESPN Outdoors block. In 1996, Guns & Ammo magazine bought the show from ESPN, and became Guns & Ammo presents American Shooter. In 1997, TNN picked up American Shooter as part of their TNN Outdoors block. In 2003, OLN picked up American Shooter, where they aired new episodes.

References

1993 American television series debuts
2003 American television series endings
Gray Television